Winter coat can mean:
A garment worn by people in winter or other cold weather
Thick fur which an animal grows to keep warm in the winter.